In music, Op. 21 stands for Opus number 21. Compositions that are assigned this number include:

 Barber – Capricorn Concerto
 Beethoven – Symphony No. 1
 Britten – Diversions for Piano Left Hand and Orchestra
 Chopin – Piano Concerto No. 2
 Dvořák – Piano Trio No. 1
 Enescu – Symphony No. 3
 Giraud – Pierrot lunaire
 Graham – Episodes
 Lalo – Symphonie espagnole
 Larionov – Chout
 Oswald – Cello Sonata No. 1
 Ries – Cello Sonata No. 3
 Sarasate – Spanish Dances, Book I
 Schumann – Novelletten
 Villiers – Elegiac Ode
 Weill – Der Zar lässt sich photographieren